Eremochlaena is a genus of moths of the family Noctuidae, first described by Charles Boursin in 1953. The type species is Eremochlaena orana .

Species list
Species accepted by IRMNG are:
Eremochlaena orana 
Eremochlaena oranoides 
Eremochlaena pallidior

References

Cuculliinae